Robert Sterling (born William Sterling Hart; November 13, 1917 – May 30, 2006) was an American actor. He was best known for starring in the television series Topper (1953–1955).

In 1960, Sterling was honored with a star on the Hollywood Walk of Fame for his contributions to the television industry.

Early life

Sterling was born William Sterling Hart in New Castle, Pennsylvania, 50 miles (80 km) northwest of Pittsburgh. The son of Chicago Cubs baseball player William S. Hart, he attended the University of Pittsburgh and worked as a clothing salesman before pursuing an acting career.

Career

Columbia Pictures
After signing with Columbia Pictures in 1939, he changed his name to Robert Sterling to avoid confusion with silent western star William S. Hart. His name was legally changed while he was a second lieutenant attending flight training in Marfa in West Texas in 1943.

Sterling appeared in small parts for Columbia movies, often uncredited: Blondie Meets the Boss (1939), Romance of the Redwoods (1939), First Offenders (1939), Outside These Walls (1939), The Chump Takes a Bump (1939), That Girl from College (1939), and a serial Mandrake the Magician (1939).

He was in Only Angels Have Wings (1939), Missing Daughters (1939), and a short with Buster Keaton, Pest from the West (1939). Sterling was in  Good Girls Go to Paris (1939), The Man They Could Not Hang (1939), Golden Boy (1939), The Gates of Alcatraz (1939), A Woman Is the Judge (1939), The Story of Charles Goodyear (1939), Scandal Sheet (1939), Mr Smith Goes to Washington (1939), Beware Spooks! (1939), Blondie Brings Up Baby (1939), The Amazing Mr Williams (1939), Glove Slingers (1939), The Awful Goof (1939) (a short), and Crime's End (1939).

He was in Nothing But Pleasure (1940) a Buster Keaton short, and The Heckler (1940) a short with Charley Chase,

20th Century Fox
At 20th Century Fox he played the lead in Manhattan Heartbeat (1940) and Yesterday's Heroes (1940). He was in The Gay Caballero (1940)

MGM
In November 1940, Sterling went to Metro-Goldwyn-Mayer. He appeared in The Penalty (1941) and had the lead in I'll Wait for You (1941), The Getaway (1941), and Ringside Maisie (1941) with Ann Sothern, whom he would later marry.

He had a good support role in Two-Faced Woman (1941) with Greta Garbo and Johnny Eager (1941) with Robert Taylor. Sterling could also be see in Dr. Kildare's Victory (1942) and This Time for Keeps (1942). He was billed third in Somewhere I'll Find You (1942), after Clark Gable and Lana Turner - one of MGM's biggest films of the year. But just as it seemed Sterling was about to break through as a star he joined the service.

Post war
Sterling served in World War II as a United States Army Air Corps flight instructor. He got out of the army in October 1945 and MGM announced him for The Last Time I Saw Paris but the film would not be made for several years, and not with Sterling. He appeared in The Secret Heart (1946) at MGM.

At RKO he had the lead in Roughshod (1949). He made an independent Western, The Sundowners (1950) with Robert Preston and John Drew Barrymore, and did Bunco Squad (1951) at RKO.

He was appearing on Broadway in The Grammercy Ghost when he formed a relationship with actress/singer Anne Jeffreys.

On television, Sterling starred in "The Man Who Had Influence", the May 29, 1950, episode of Studio One. He also appeared on such shows as The Ford Theatre Hour, Showtime, U.S.A., The Clock, The Web (starring in the episode "Homecoming"), Faith Baldwin Romance Theatre, Celanese Theatre, Lights Out (one episode with Grace Kelly), Betty Crocker Star Matinee (an episode with Audrey Hepburn), Suspense, The Gulf Playhouse, Robert Montgomery Presents, Studio One in Hollywood (an adaptation of The Ambassadors), and Climax!.

Sterling had an excellent part as Steve Baker, opposite Ava Gardner as Julie, in the hit MGM 1951 film version of Show Boat.  He supported Audie Murphy in Column South (1953). He and his second wife, actress Anne Jeffreys, also developed a night club act.

Topper

Sterling is perhaps most well known for starring with Jeffreys as the spirited George Kerby, to Jeffreys' Marion Kerby in the television program Topper, based on the 1937 original film Topper; Sterling played Cary Grant's role in the TV series, which aired on the CBS network from 1953 to 1955. Leo G. Carroll starred in the title role. Wife Marion Kerby was referred to as "the ghostess with the mostest", while Sterling's character was known as "that most sporty spirit".

In 1955 he and Jeffreys appeared in a TV production of Dearest Enemy, adapted by Neil Simon. He continued to guest star on shows like The Loretta Young Show, Lux Video Theatre, Star Stage, The 20th Century-Fox Hour, The Ford Television Theatre, Cavalcade of America, and Telephone Time.

On December 18, 1957, Sterling and Jeffreys played a couple with an unusual courtship arrangement in "The Julie Gage Story" on the first season of NBC's Wagon Train.

Love That Jill
In 1958, the couple co-starred in another comedy series, Love That Jill on ABC. Sterling and Jeffreys portrayed heads of rival modeling agencies in New York City.

Sterling appeared on The United States Steel Hour, then returned to features at Fox. He had good roles in Return to Peyton Place (1961), as Mike Rossi, husband of Eleanor Parker, and Voyage to the Bottom of the Sea (1961) for Irwin Allen.

Ichabod and Me
In the 1961–1962 television season, Sterling co-starred with George Chandler and Reta Shaw in CBS's Ichabod and Me.

In 1963, Sterling starred in The Twilight Zone episode "Printer's Devil" alongside Burgess Meredith. He was also in The Alfred Hitchcock Hour and Naked City, plus A Global Affair (1964) with Bob Hope.

Later career
After some additional television work in the early 1960s, Sterling made only sporadic appearances in later shows such as the hospital drama The Bold Ones, the sitcoms Nanny and the Professor, Love, American Style, Diana and The Brian Keith Show, the TV movie Letters from Three Lovers (1973), and the miniseries Beggarman, Thief in 1979.

In the 1970s Sterling was a vice president and the spokesman for a company that implemented the software for one of the first supermarket barcoding and computer inventory systems. He later launched Sterling & Sons, a Santa Monica company that manufactured custom golf clubs.

In the 1980s he guest starred on shows like Fantasy Island, Simon & Simon, Masquerade, Murder, She Wrote, and Hotel.

Sterling's star on the Hollywood Walk of Fame is located at 1709 Vine Street.

Personal life

Sterling was married twice. His first marriage, in 1943, was to actress-singer Ann Sothern. They had a daughter, Patricia, who became an actress. Sothern and Sterling divorced in 1949.

Sterling met actress-singer Anne Jeffreys soon after his Broadway debut, and they wed in 1951 and remained married for 55 years until his death. They had three sons.

Sterling was a Republican who campaigned for Dwight Eisenhower in the 1952 presidential election.

Sterling died Tuesday, May 30, 2006, aged 88, at his home in Brentwood, Los Angeles, California. According to the Associated Press, his son, Jeffrey, indicated that Sterling died of natural causes and also suffered from debilitating shingles for the last decade of his life. He was cremated and his ashes were returned to his family in residence.

References

External links
 

1917 births
2006 deaths
American male film actors
American male stage actors
American male television actors
American male comedy actors
20th-century American male actors
Male actors from Pennsylvania
Metro-Goldwyn-Mayer contract players
People from New Castle, Pennsylvania
University of Pittsburgh alumni
Pennsylvania Republicans
California Republicans